San Feliciano is a village in the municipality of Magione in the Province of Perugia, Umbria in Italy. From San Feliciano a ferry leaves for the Isola Polvese.

It is a fishing village and centre for tourism in the Commune of Magione. Among its attractions is the Museo della Pesca, a joint venture between local authorities and fishermen’s cooperatives.

The village lies 4 km south west of Magione and 18 km west of Perugia at the Lake Trasimeno. San Feliciano has around 580 inhabitants,

External links 
 Website van de Pro Loco in San Felicia

References

Frazioni of the Province of Perugia